Gaya Prasad Pal (born 1950) is an Indian anatomist, professor and the director of Modern Institute of Medical Sciences, Indore. An elected fellow of the National Academy of Medical Sciences, Indian Academy of Sciences and National Academy of Sciences, India, Pal is known for his researches on biomechanics and load transmission of human spinal column. The Council of Scientific and Industrial Research, the apex agency of the Government of India for scientific research, awarded him the Shanti Swarup Bhatnagar Prize for Science and Technology, one of the highest Indian science awards for his contributions to Medical Sciences in 1993.

Biography 
Born on 7 June 1950 in Indore, an industrial city in the Indian state of Madhya Pradesh to Baboolal Kalideen and Kaserben, G. P. Pal graduated in medicine from Mahatma Gandhi Memorial Medical College, Indore in 1973 after which he joined the institution as a demonstrator, simultaneously studying for MS in Anatomy which he earned in 1977. He moved to the Government Medical College, Surat as an assistant professor at the department of anatomy and was serving as an associate professor when he was appointed as the professor and head of the department of anatomy at MP Shah Medical College, Jamnagar in 1992. Later, he joined Modern Institute of Medical Sciences, Indore where he heads the department of anatomy and serves as the director. In between, he also worked as a visiting faculty at Medical College of Pennsylvania, Philadelphia during 1985–86 and 1987–90.

Pal is married to Pushpa Verma and the couple has two children, Sandeep and Neeta. The family lives in Padmavaty Colony, Indore.

Legacy 
Focusing his researches on the biomechanics of human spinal column, Pal elucidated the roles played by vertebral arches and their zygapophyseal joints in weight transmission along the vertebral column. These studies have assisted in the understanding the spinal disorder called idiopathic scoliosis. His researches have been documented by way of several articles and the online repository of scientific articles of the Indian Academy of Sciences has listed a number of them. Besides, he has published several books which include Illustrated Textbook of Neuroanatomy, Text Book of Histology, Basics Of Medical Genetics, Human Embryyology, General Anatomy (basic Concepts In Human Gross Anatomy), Human Osteology: Text and Colour Atlas and Medical Genetics and his work has been cited in many text books on anatomy. He also serves as the editor of the Histology section of the Journal of Anatomical Society of India.

Awards and honors 
The Council of Scientific and Industrial Research awarded him Shanti Swarup Bhatnagar Prize, one of the highest Indian science awards in 1993. The Indian Academy of Sciences elected him as a fellow in 1994 and the National Academy of Sciences, India and the National Academy of Medical Sciences followed suit in 1995 and 1996 respectively. He is also a founder fellow of the Anatomical Society of India.

Selected bibliography

Books

Articles

See also 
 Vertebral column

Notes

References

External links 
 

1950 births
Indian medical writers
Living people
Indian anatomists
Indian medical administrators
Recipients of the Shanti Swarup Bhatnagar Award in Medical Science
Fellows of the Indian Academy of Sciences
Fellows of The National Academy of Sciences, India
Fellows of the National Academy of Medical Sciences
Scientists from Indore
20th-century Indian medical doctors
Medical doctors from Madhya Pradesh